The Lewa Wildlife Conservancy (also known as Lewa Downs) is located in northern Kenya. The Conservancy is home to a wide variety of wildlife including the rare and endangered black rhinos, Grevy's zebras and sitatungas. It also includes the big five (lion, leopards, elephants, rhinos and Cape buffaloes). Lewa holds over 12% of Kenya's eastern black rhinoceros population and the largest single population of Grevy's zebras in the world (approximately 350 individuals).

The Conservancy is also home to the Northern Rangelands Trust, an innovative partnership with a number of communities to the north who have given land for the preservation of wildlife. Lewa has its own education program that helps develop schools and students. Lewa Wildlife Conservancy is located in Meru County, south of Isiolo town but north of Mount Kenya.

History of Lewa 

The Craig/Douglas family were allocated the land by the British colonial government in 1922 and managed it as a cattle ranch for over 50 years. Unlike many other ranchers in the area, they had always valued the wildlife that shared the land with the cattle and developed wildlife tourism as an additional activity.

By the early 1980s it was uncertain whether any black rhinos would survive in Kenya. Poaching for horn had reduced Kenya's rhinos from some 20,000 in the mid-1970s to a few hundred by 1986. It was clear that the only way to prevent their complete extinction was to create high security sanctuaries.

In 1983 the Craigs and Anna Merz – who funded the program – decided to establish the fenced and guarded Ngare Sergoi Rhino Sanctuary at the western end of Lewa Downs. The rhino sanctuary was stocked partly with animals from other reserves and partly by isolated individuals from northern Kenya, whose likely survival was a matter of months at most. The black rhino that were caught settled down and bred, and white rhino were added.

After ten years, it was clear that the rhinos needed more space, and the sanctuary was expanded to cover the rest of the ranch, and the adjoining Ngare Ndare Forest Reserve. In 2001 Lewa partnered with Gerald Chamales to change his company's name to Rhinotek Computer Products, when the company began sending part of its annual revenue to support Lewa.

The perimeter was almost entirely fenced, for security and to ensure that elephants did not raid crops in neighbouring farms, but the ecological connections between Lewa and neighbouring wildlife areas were maintained by leaving gaps in the fence for animal movements. At the same time the entire property was converted to a wildlife sanctuary, as the Craig family handed over the management of the ranch to a non-profit organisation – the Lewa Wildlife Conservancy.

The conservancy is home to Lewa Airport. Annually, the Lewa Marathon is held in the Lewa Conservancy for fundraising purposes. Unlike normal marathons, Lewa Marathon is contested on dirt track.

On 19 October 2010, Prince William of Wales proposed marriage to Catherine Middleton at Lewa. That year, 13% of Kenya's rhinos lived in the Lewa Wildlife Conservancy – 66 white rhinos and 72 black rhinos.

Wildlife and security on Lewa 

The Lewa Wildlife Conservancy is relatively close to historically volatile areas of northern Kenya, where banditry, poaching and illegal firearms were once prolific. The threat to Lewa's wildlife and, in particular, its rhinos is ever present, although with improved security throughout northern Kenya and increasingly good relations with its neighbours, the situation has improved in recent years. The rhinoceros population requires constant monitoring and protection due to their threatened status, continued pressure and the recent occurrence of rhino poaching elsewhere in the country.

To provide a high level of protection for the wildlife, especially the endangered wildlife, as well as the people on Lewa Wildlife Conservancy, it is essential to have an extremely effective security system. Lewa's security operation includes a well-trained and highly motivated ranger force, both armed and unarmed; a tracker dog team; and reliable communications network with its neighbours, the Kenya Wildlife Service (KWS), local government agencies, community conservancies affiliated to the Northern Rangelands Trust and private wildlife conservation projects and conservancies in the area. Regular aerial surveillance is carried out and the boundary electric game fence is maintained.

Neighboring communities, and other organisations frequently request Lewa's assistance with support and follow-up to incidents such as poaching, cattle rustling, robbery and banditry. Lewa's internal security operations have a good record: only two rhinos have been lost to poaching on the Conservancy (Ntoiye and Tana, were shot on 26 December 2009; Tana survived until 5 March 2010). Lewa was the only wildlife sanctuary in Kenya not to have lost a rhino to poachers in 2014. Lewa's anti-poaching teams have been deployed to other rhino sanctuaries following serious levels of rhino poaching and have effectively reduced rhino poaching as a result. In 2015 Edward Ndiritu, employed at Lewa as head of the Anti-Poaching Unit and the Northern Rangeland Trust, received the Tusk Wildlife Ranger Award from Prince William.

International Collaborations 
Teams from the Al Ain Zoo, United Arab Emirates, collaborates in partnership with the Lewa Wildlife Conservancy to support the protection and conservation of wild black and white rhinos. The team together, track each individual rhino to protect them from illegal poachers, monitor their health, and carry out important research.

References

External links 
Lewa Wildlife Conservancy

National parks of Kenya
Protected areas established in 1995